"Flower Festival: Vision Factory Presents" (stylized as FLOWER FESTIVAL ～VISION FACTORY presents～) is a Vision Factory artists compilation album with a spring theme. The CD has warm pieces of music by artists who have matched their songs to the theme, the season of flowers. It was released on March 19, 2008 in CD format only.

Track listing

References

External links
Album info

2008 compilation albums
Avex Group albums
Avex Group compilation albums
Lead (band) albums
Olivia Lufkin albums
Asuka Hinoi songs